The Linotronic imagesetters are a now common type of high-quality printer, capable of printing at resolutions of up to 2540 dots per inch. The Linotronic allowed graphic artists to cheaply set type that exceeded the quality of many phototypesetting systems in use at the time.  Although too expensive for homes or most offices, but cheaper than many other alternatives of printing, it was the graphic designer's dream: output by taking a PostScript file on a removable disk to a service bureau for output on the bureau's Linotronic.

Manufactured by Mergenthaler Linotype Company and popularized by the Adobe RIP, enabling PostScript language files to be imaged by the Linotronic imagesetter. Although it was the first commercial usage of PostScript, which began the emergence of graphics applications dominance by Adobe, the first popular use of PostScript was the Apple Laserwriter (succeeded a few months later by the LaserWriter Plus).

Adobe's RIPs have, generally, been named for United States rockets (Atlas, Redstone, etcetera), but Apple's RIP was of its own design, and was implemented using remarkably few integrated circuits (ICs), including PALs for most combinatorial logic, with the subsystem timing, DRAM refreshing, and rasterization functions being implemented in very few medium-integration PALs. Apple's competitors (i.e., QMS, NEC, and others) have generally used a variation of one of Adobe's RIPs with their large quantity of low-integration (i.e., Texas Instruments' 7400 series) ICs.

The latest RIPs are stand-alone fast PCs executing an x86 implementation of PostScript, with a special video output interface to the imagesetter.

References
 History of Linotype: 1963–1972
 Linotype Library: A name with a long tradition 

Printing